Mark Walton may refer to:

 Mark Walton (musician) (born 1957), New Zealand born clarinettist, saxophonist, composer, arranger, and musical educator
 Mark Walton (footballer) (born 1969), former professional footballer
 Mark Walton (story artist) (born 1968), story artist and voice actor at Walt Disney Feature Animation
 Mark Walton (American football) (born 1997), American football player
 Mark Walton (bowls) (born 1967), English lawn bowler